The doli is played across Georgia in the Caucasus. The body consists of a hollow wooden cylinder covered with leather tightly attached to it with iron rings. It is played by palms and fingers, under or over the arm, while sitting or dancing. It is struck in the center to get the forte effect and at the edges to get a piano effect. The doli’s height and diameter of the body and head is about 3 to 1. It is mostly men who play the doli. In performance, the doli creates the rhythm of the dance.  The doli is often combined with other regional instruments including the chonguri, the chiboni, the salamuri, the buzika and the duduki.

Musical instruments of Georgia (country)

ka:დოლი (მუსიკა)